McAnn is a surname. Notable people with the surname include:

Aida McAnn Flemming, CM (1896–1994), wife of Premier of New Brunswick Hugh John Flemming
Donald Roy McAnn (born 1911), United States Navy sailor awarded the Navy Cross posthumously
Eamon Mcann or Eamonn McCann, (born 1943), Irish journalist, author and political activist

See also
Thom McAnn or Thom McAn, a brand of shoes distributed by Footstar, Inc.
, Cannon-class destroyer escort built for the United States Navy during World War II
, provisional name given to HMS Balfour (K464), a Buckley-class Captain-class frigate during World War II
MacCunn
Machan
McCain (disambiguation)
McCane
McCann (disambiguation)